Mark Ian Ellis (born 30 September 1988) is an English professional footballer who plays as a defender for York City on loan from  club Barrow. 

He began his career at Bolton Wanderers, and was the last footballer to sign a contract under Sam Allardyce, but without making a senior appearance. He has previously played in the Football league for Crewe Alexandra, Shrewsbury Town, Carlisle United and Tranmere Rovers as well as loan spells in the National League for Forest Green Rovers, Leyton Orient and Notts County and Solihull Moors.

Career

Torquay United
Ellis was born in Kingsbridge, Devon. He made his debut for Torquay on 22 September 2007, in the Football Conference clash with Kidderminster Harriers, at Aggborough, which ended in a 5–2 win to Torquay. Following the Gulls promotion to the Football League, Ellis began the 2009–10 season on loan at Conference Premier club Forest Green Rovers.

Crewe Alexandra
Ellis turned down a new contract at Torquay United to join newly promoted Crewe Alexandra in League One on 27 June 2012. During his time at the club, he was part of the squad that won the 2012–13 Football League Trophy, also notably playing the full match as they beat Southend United 2–0 in the final at Wembley Stadium.

Shrewsbury Town
Following his release from Crewe Alexandra, Ellis joined up with Shrewsbury Town on 30 May 2014 on a two-year contract with an option for a further year. He made his debut on the opening day of the season against A.F.C. Wimbledon, but found himself in and out of the starting eleven in the first few months of the season.

Due to the suspension of fellow defender Jermaine Grandison, he was recalled to the starting line-up and scored his first goal for the club in a 2–2 draw with local rivals Walsall in a first round FA Cup tie in November 2014. Although Grandison was reinstated for the following match, Ellis was recalled again after his teammate withdrew from the squad with illness against Cambridge United on 13 December. This time he kept his place in the team, helping Shrewsbury keep clean sheets against promotion rivals Wycombe Wanderers and Luton Town, and also scoring away at Oxford United in a 2–0 Boxing Day win.

Ellis became a first-team regular in the second half of the season as Shrewsbury were promoted back to League One at the first attempt, finishing as runners-up to Burton Albion. However, in October 2015, he returned to League Two, signing a one-month loan deal with Carlisle United after losing his place to emerging youngster Dominic Smith. Having been ever-present for Carlisle during his initial loan spell, the temporary deal was later extended to 2 January 2016.

Carlisle United
At the conclusion of his loan, Ellis signed permanently for Carlisle until summer 2018.

Forest Green Rovers
In January 2017, Ellis re-joined Forest Green Rovers on loan until the end of the season. He made his second debut for Forest Green on 28 January 2017 in a 3–2 away win at Barrow. Ellis returned to Carlisle at the end of his loan spell with Rovers.

Leyton Orient
On 28 September 2017, Ellis signed on a two-month loan with National League club Leyton Orient. He made his debut two days later in the 2–1 defeat at home to AFC Fylde.

Tranmere Rovers
On 21 May 2018 Ellis signed a two-year deal for newly promoted Tranmere after electing not to resign with Carlisle. Ellis ruptured his ACL in April 2019, making his return ten months later in a Cheshire Cup fixture against Crewe Alexandra. He signed a further one-year deal ahead of the 2020-21 season.  On 8 March 2021, Ellis joined National League side Notts County on loan for the remainder of the 2020–21 season.

Barrow
Ellis signed for Barrow on a two-year deal on 18 June 2021. On 25 January 2022, Ellis joined National League side Solihull Moors on loan for the remainder of the 2021–22 season. He subsequently re-joined Torquay United on loan in October 2022. In February 2023, he returned to the National League with York City on loan until the end of the season.

Career statistics

Honours
Crewe Alexandra
Football League Trophy: 2012–13

Shrewsbury Town
Football League Two runner-up: 2014–15

References

External links

1988 births
Living people
People from Kingsbridge
Footballers from Devon
English footballers
Association football defenders
Bolton Wanderers F.C. players
Torquay United F.C. players
Forest Green Rovers F.C. players
Crewe Alexandra F.C. players
Shrewsbury Town F.C. players
Carlisle United F.C. players
Leyton Orient F.C. players
Tranmere Rovers F.C. players
Notts County F.C. players
Barrow A.F.C. players
Solihull Moors F.C. players
York City F.C. players
English Football League players
National League (English football) players